Tabtoxinine β-lactam is a monobactam antibiotic derived from tabtoxin. Unlike other β-lactam antibiotics, which inhibit penicillin-binding proteins, tabtoxinine β-lactam inhibits glutamine synthetase.

References

Lactams
Amino acid derivatives